The  is a skyscraper located in Morioka, Iwate Prefecture, Japan. Construction of the 92-metre, 20-storey skyscraper was finished in 1997.

External links
  

Buildings and structures completed in 1997
Morioka, Iwate
Skyscrapers in Japan
Buildings and structures in Iwate Prefecture
1997 establishments in Japan